Odisha Cricket Association (abbreviated OCA) is the governing body of the Cricket activities in the Odisha state of India and the Odisha cricket team. It was formed in 1949 and was made into an independent registered body in 1961. Its headquarters is located in the Cuttack Barabati Stadium Complex. It is affiliated to the Board of Control for Cricket in India. The OCA started a state-level Twenty-20 tournament, Odisha Premier League (OPL) in the lines of Indian Premier League in 2011.

OCA manages the famous Barabati Stadium and has got infrastructures and facilities like Odisha cricket academy, newly built Sachin Tendulkar Indoor cricket hall and OCA Club complex and many grounds like DRIEMS cricket stadium, Ravenshaw university ground, SCB medical ground, Nimpur ground, Basundhara (Bidanasi) ground, Sunshine Ground, etc.

Office bearers

Presidents
The following is a list of presidents of OCA:

Secretaries
The following is a list of secretaries of OCA:

References

External links
 OCA official site
 Odisha Cricnewzz

Cricket administration in India
Cricket in Odisha
1949 establishments in Orissa
Organisations based in Odisha
Sports organizations established in 1949